Diva Muffin Zappa (born July 30, 1979) is an American artist and actress who has also recorded a one-off comedy single. She is the youngest child of musician Frank Zappa and wife Gail Zappa.

Personal life
Diva Zappa was born in Los Angeles. She has three older siblings: sister Moon, and brothers Dweezil, and Ahmet.

According to Frank, she was given the name Diva "because of the loud quality of her voice. She's audible at 300 yards." Diva Zappa won an award at age 12 in a poster contest to raise awareness about child abuse and neglect.

Diva's father Frank died in 1993. Following the death of her mother Gail in October 2015, Diva and her brother Ahmet were awarded control of the Zappa Family Trust with shares of 30% each, while Moon and Dweezil were given smaller shares of 20% each. As beneficiaries only, Moon and Dweezil will not receive distributions from the trust until it is profitable per the trust agreement; in 2016, it was still in debt and they must seek permission from Ahmet, the trustee, to earn money with their father's music or from merchandise bearing his name. The uneven divide of the trust has resulted in several conflicts between Zappa's children, including a feud between Dweezil and Ahmet over Dweezil's use of his father's music in live performances. In a 2016 interview with the Los Angeles Times, Diva Zappa said her primary role in the trust is to be present when her father's work is highlighted.

Career
Diva Zappa's first film appearance was in the 1998 film Anarchy TV, along with her older siblings. Since then, she has also appeared in Children of the Corn V: Fields of Terror (1998), National Lampoon's Pledge This! (2006), as well as various TV shows including Felicity, Brothers & Sisters, and The Mighty Boosh.

In 1999, Diva released a comedy single called "When the Ball Drops" about her "hunt for someone to make out with on the Millennium". Tipper Gore played drums on the recording and Kristin Gore sang backup vocals.

Since 2002, Diva has run her own website/business called "Hand Made Beauty" where she sells her own self-designed and made clothing. The clothing is primarily knitted or crocheted, and consists of hats, ponchos and skirts. A percentage of all sales are donated to the Creative Visions Foundation. She was initially taught how to knit by actress Laurie Metcalf. She does not plan her work, preferring instead to work in a spontaneous manner. In 2011, Zappa had her first UK show of "contemporary knitwear art and couture canvases" with an exhibition titled "Bruce" at the Maison Bertaux Gallery in Soho. The exhibition featured an embroidered photograph of her brother Dweezil playing guitar.

A full-length dress Diva knitted was worn to the 2009 Grammy Awards by Chloé Trujillo, the wife of Metallica bassist Robert Trujillo. She also made a cape for Diablo Cody.

On October 29, 2013, she appeared in the UK premiere of her late father's orchestral work 200 Motels at the Royal Festival Hall, London, playing the role of Groupie 2 (Lucy).

She can be seen in season two of the NBC show Good Girls as a midwife.

Filmography

Film

Television

References

External links

 Hand Made Beauty

1979 births
American film actresses
American textile artists
American businesspeople in retailing
Living people
21st-century American businesspeople
American television actresses
American fashion designers
American fashion businesspeople
American artists of Arab descent
American people of Italian descent
American people of Greek descent
American people of Danish descent
American people of French descent
American people of Portuguese descent
Women textile artists
Businesspeople from Los Angeles
21st-century American businesswomen
American women fashion designers
Zappa family